Women's Party is the name of several political parties:

The Women's Party (Australia)
Women's Party (Finland); see List of political parties in Finland
Women's Party (Greenland)
Women's Party (Israel)
Women's Party (Japan) Josei-tō; see List of political parties in Japan
Women's Party (Poland)
Women's Party (South Korea)
Women's Party (Turkey)
Women's Party (UK)

See also
Women's Equality Party (UK)
Women's Equality Party (New York)

Political party disambiguation pages